Gábor Molnár (born 28 March 1972 in Budapest) is a Hungarian male weightlifter, competing in the 69 kg category and representing Hungary at international competitions. He participated at the 1996 Summer Olympics in the 70 kg event. He competed at world championships, most recently at the 1998 World Weightlifting Championships.

Major results

References

External links
 
 
 

1972 births
Living people
Hungarian male weightlifters
Weightlifters at the 1996 Summer Olympics
Olympic weightlifters of Hungary
Sportspeople from Budapest